Denis Valeryevich Selishchev (born 19 January 1994) is a Russian professional football player.

Club career
He made his Russian Football National League debut for FC Luch-Energiya Vladivostok on 27 May 2012 in a game against FC Fakel Voronezh.

External links
 
 
 Career summary at sportbox.ru

1994 births
Sportspeople from Penza
Living people
Russian footballers
Russia youth international footballers
Association football defenders
FC Luch Vladivostok players
FC Nosta Novotroitsk players